Eupithecia ptychospila is a moth in the family Geometridae. It is found in Madagascar.

References

Moths described in 1937
ptychospila
Moths of Madagascar